Nick Varner (born May 15, 1948, in Owensboro, Kentucky) is an American pool player who was inducted into the Billiard Congress of America Hall of Fame in 1992. Varner is widely considered one of the greatest pool players of all time. Varner is a multiple world champion and has won back to back U.S. Open 9-Ball Championships, in addition to being the oldest player to ever win the WPA World Nine-ball Championship, at 51 years old.

Career
Nick D. Varner graduated from Tell City High School in Tell City, Indiana in 1966. Varner learned to play pool in his father's (Nick Varner) pool hall in Grandview, Indiana. After graduating from high school, Varner gained notoriety on the professional pool scene after he won two ACU-I Intercollegiate Championships while attending Purdue University and playing "money games" at an on campus pool room called "The Hole". A cliché given to Varner was "Speak softly and carry a big stick" because of the way he conducted himself as well as his competitive endeavors.

In 1989, Varner became only the second man to Mike Sigel, to earn over $100,000 in prize winnings in single year, accumulating an unprecedented 8 out of the 16 Nine-ball PBA tour events that year. The same year he won the PBA World 9-Ball Championship, after a momentous hill-hill final against Grady Mathews.

He was named Player of the Year in 1980, 1982, 1989, 1994, by the pool media, including the National Billiard News and Billiards Digest Magazine. He also represented Team USA eight times at the Mosconi Cup, four times as a non-playing team captain.

Varner is also an author, a video personality, a pool room proprietor, a manufacturer's representative, and an exhibition player.

Varner is considered one of the best all-around players of all time, winning multiple titles in Nine-ball, Eight-ball, Straight Pool, One Pocket and Bank Pool. 

Varner is one of the few players to be inducted into the BCA, One Pocket and Bank Pool Hall of Fame.

Career titles and achievements

References

External links
 "bio on NickVarner.com" 
 "Nick Varner Custom Cues", Nick Varner Custom Cues
 "Nick Varner Player Profile", InternationalPoolTour.com, International Pool Tour

American pool players
1948 births
Living people
People from Owensboro, Kentucky
World champions in pool
WPA World Nine-ball Champions